Zachhuber is a German surname. Notable people with the surname include:

 Andreas Zachhuber (born 1962), German footballer and manager
 Eric Zachhuber (born 1993), Austrian footballer

German-language surnames